was a Japanese long-distance runner. He was diminutive, weighing 115 pounds and standing 5'5". He competed in the marathon at the 1960 Summer Olympics, finishing 32nd in 2:29:45, and in the 1964 Summer Olympics in the 10,000 meter run, finishing 28th in 31.00.6. His personal bests for the marathon were 2:15:40 while winning the Beppu marathon, and the 10,000 meters in 29:10.4 on the track, both run in 1963. His best time for 10 miles on the roads was 50:31 in 1957 when he was 21 years old.

References

External links
 

1935 births
2022 deaths
Athletes (track and field) at the 1960 Summer Olympics
Athletes (track and field) at the 1964 Summer Olympics
Japanese male long-distance runners
Japanese male marathon runners
Olympic athletes of Japan
Chuo University alumni
Sportspeople from Fukuoka (city)
20th-century Japanese people